The  Little League World Series took place between August 22 and August 26 in Williamsport, Pennsylvania. Northern Little League of El Cajon, California, defeated El Campo Little League of El Campo, Texas, in the championship game of the 15th Little League World Series.

Teams

Winners bracket

Consolation bracket

Notable players
 Brian Sipe of El Cajon went on to play professional football in the NFL and USFL from 1974 through 1985; he was inducted to the Little League Hall of Excellence in 1999.
George Strickler of American Little League became a successful engineer and golfer.

References

External links
1961 Little League World Series
Line scores for the 1961 LLWS

Little League World Series
Little League World Series
Little League World Series